Japu Deru is an Indian politician from the state of Arunachal Pradesh.

Deru was elected unopposed from the Bomdila constituency in the 2014 Arunachal Pradesh Legislative Assembly election, standing as a BJP candidate.

See also
Arunachal Pradesh Legislative Assembly

References

External links
Japu Deru profile
MyNeta Profile
Japu Deru FB

Living people
Bharatiya Janata Party politicians from Arunachal Pradesh
Arunachal Pradesh MLAs 2014–2019
Year of birth missing (living people)